Earl of Orkney, historically Jarl of Orkney, is a title of nobility encompassing the archipelagoes of Orkney and Shetland, which comprise the Northern Isles of Scotland. Originally founded by Norse invaders, the status of the rulers of the Northern Isles as Norwegian vassals was formalised in 1195. Although the Old Norse term jarl is etymologically related to "earl", and the jarls were succeeded by earls in the late 15th century, a Norwegian jarl is not the same thing. In the Norse context the distinction between jarls and kings did not become significant until the late 11th century and the early jarls would therefore have had considerable independence of action until that time. The position of Jarl of Orkney was eventually the most senior rank in medieval Norway except for the king himself.

The jarls were periodically subject to the kings of Alba for those parts of their territory in what is now mainland Scotland (i.e. Caithness and Sutherland). In 1232, a Scottish dynasty descended from the mormaers of Angus replaced the previous family descended from the late 10th century jarl Torf-Einarr, although the isles remained formally subject to Norway. This family was in turn replaced by the descendants of the mormaers of Strathearn and later still by the Sinclair family, during whose time Orkney and Shetland became part of Scotland.

The second earldom was created by James VI of Scotland in 1581 for his half-uncle Robert Stewart but after only two incumbents the title was forfeited in 1614. After the third creation of 1696, which title still exists today, the earls' influence on Orcadian affairs became negligible.

Norse Jarls

Rognvald Eysteinsson, Jarl of Møre  865–890  is sometimes credited with being the founder of the jarldom. By implication the Orkneyinga saga identifies him as such for he is given "dominion" over Orkney and Shetland by King Harald Finehair, although there is no concrete suggestion he ever held the title. The Heimskringla states that his brother Sigurd was the first to formally hold the title.

Sigurd's son Guthorm ruled for a year and died childless. Rognvald's son Hallad then inherited the title. However, unable to constrain Danish raids on Orkney, he gave up the jarldom and returned to Norway, which "everyone thought was a huge joke". Torf-Einarr then succeeded in defeating the Danes and founded a dynasty which retained control of the islands for centuries after his death.  Smyth (1984) concludes that the role of the brothers Eysteinsson lacks historical credibility and that Torf-Einarr “may be regarded as the first historical earl of Orkney”.

Drawing on Adam of Bremen's assertion that Orkney was not conquered until the time of Harald Hardrada, who ruled Norway from 1043 to 1066, Woolf (2007) speculates that Sigurd “the Stout” Hlodvirsson, Torf-Einarr's great-grandson, may have been the first Jarl of Orkney. Dates are largely conjectural, at least until his death recorded in 1014.

Assuming Torf-Einarr is a genuine historical figure, all of the subsequent jarls were descended from him, save for Sigurd Magnusson, whose short rule was imposed by his father  Magnus Barelegs, and who later became Sigurd I of Norway.

One of the main sources for the lives and times of these jarls is the Orkneyinga saga, which has been described as having "no parallel in the social and literary record of Scotland". One of the key events of the saga is the "martyrdom" of Jarl Magnus Erlendsson, later Saint Magnus, c. 1115. The last quarter of the saga is taken up with a lengthy tale of  Jarl Rögnvald Kali Kolsson and Sweyn Asleifsson — indeed the oldest version ends with  the latter's death in 1171.

After the murder of Jarl Jon Haraldsson some sixty years later, Magnus, son of Gille Brigte became the first of the Scottish earls. He may have been a descendant of Jarl Rögnvald Kali Kolsson, although this has never been corroborated. However, the line of specifically Norse jarls is said to have come to an end when Jarl Magnus II was granted his title by Haakon IV of Norway c. 1236.

Scottish Jarls under the Norwegian Crown

After the close of the Jarls' Saga on the death of Jon Haraldsson in 1230, the history of Orkney is "plunged into a darkness which is illuminated by very few written sources". The first jarl known to have held the title after the Norse dynasty came to and end in 1230 was Magnus II but the title may have been held by an unknown other prior to his investiture. Although successive Jarls of Orkney were related, they each acquired the position by being personally appointed to the role by the Norwegian king; the Jarldom was not inheritable.

The Angus Jarls

Strathearn and Sinclair Jarls

The lack of haste with which a new title was granted by the Norwegians to Orkney has led to the suggestion that Magnus Jonsson may have had an heir who was a minor, but who died before 1330. It is also likely that unravelling the genealogy of his potential successors and providing proofs of their descent was a time-consuming project. Whatever the reason, about a decade after Magnus's death the title was granted to Maol Íosa, Mormaer of Strathearn, a distant relative of Earl Gilbert. He ruled Orkney and Caithness from 1330 to 1350 and had several daughters, but no sons.

The earldom was then left vacant for about three years, following which Erengisle Suneson was a titular earl for a few years but when his right to the title lapsed prior to 1360  the jarldom lay vacant again. Haakon VI, the Norwegian king, had married the daughter of Valdemar IV, the King of Denmark. The sudden death of the Swedish king's rebel son, from plague, triggered the foreign policy obligations Haakon had to Valdemar, as a result of the marriage. These drew Haakon's attention away from Orkney, until the death of Valdemar, in 1375.

In 1375, Haakon decided upon Alexander of Ard, the son of Maol Íosa's daughter Matilda and Weland of Ard (Aird, west of Inverness) as Suneson's successor. However, Alexander was merely appointed "Lieutenant, Captain and Keeper" of Orkney for a year on 30 June 1375. This was to be a probationary role, the intention being that if Haakon had been satisfied by Alexander's behaviour after a year, he would be appointed  as jarl. However, Haakon did not do so, possibly because Alexander failed to deal with the violence that had become rife during the long absence of an earl's authority. In 1379, the jarldom was granted to another grandson of Maol Íosa, Henry Sinclair, by Haakon VI on 2 August 1379.

When James III of Scotland married Margaret of Denmark, her father, Christian I, king of the Kalmar Union, was unable to immediately provide a dowry. Instead, he promised that he would provide the dowry at a later date, and pledged the Norðreyjar as security for his promise. In 1470, James persuaded William to quitclaim his rights over Orkney and Shetland only, in return for lands in Fife; technically the Norðreyjar remained in existence as a Norwegian Jarldom, but William's authority became limited to the mainland parts, while Orkney and Sheltland became jarl-free. After a few years, it became clear that the dowry was unlikely ever to be paid, so in 1472, James declared the Norðreyjar to be forfeit (and forwent the dowry). As an immediate consequence, the diocese of Caithness was transferred from the Archdiocese of Niðaróss (Trondheim), in Norway, to that of St Andrews, in Scotland.

Scottish Earls

Dukes of Orkney
 The next Orkney title was the dukedom of Orkney, which was given to James Hepburn, 4th Earl of Bothwell, husband of Mary, Queen of Scots, in 1567. Later that year, however, he forfeited the title when Mary was forced to abdicate.

Earls of Orkney, Second Creation
The second earldom was created by James VI of Scotland. The Stewart earls were based at Kirkwall Castle, which had been built by Henry I Sinclair. It was demolished on the forfeiture of the title in 1614.

Earls of Orkney, Third Creation (1696)

The last creation of the earldom was in favour of the man who in 1735 would become the first Field Marshal of Great Britain, Lord George Hamilton, the fifth son of William Douglas, Duke of Hamilton. The peerage was created with "remainder to the heirs whatsoever of his body", meaning that the title can be passed on through both male and female lines. The title passed to the O'Brien family, then to the Fitzmaurice family, and later to the St John family. The subsidiary titles of Viscount of Kirkwall and Lord Dechmont were created at the same time as the earldom.

None of these earls appear to have any connection with Orkney other than the honorific itself. The current earl, for example, was born and lives in Canada.

The 9th Earl is the son of Frederick Oliver St John, son of Isabella Annie Fitzmaurice, daughter of James Terence Fitzmaurice, fifth son of the fifth Earl. The heir apparent is the present holder's son Oliver Robert St John (b. 1969), who holds the courtesy title, Viscount Kirkwall.

Arms

See also
 Mormaer of Caithness
 Viscount St John

References

Notes

Citations

Bibliography

External links
 Orkneyjar The Heritage of the Orkney Islands

Earldoms in the Peerage of Scotland
 Earl of Orkney
Noble titles created in 1581
Noble titles created in 1696
History of Orkney
Scandinavian Scotland
Norway–Scotland relations